Nuestra Belleza Latina 2007 was the first season of Nuestra Belleza Latina. After castings around the United States and Puerto Rico 12 finalists moved to Miami and lived together where they received different classes of dancing, runway, diction, teleprompter and physical training. The finalists also competed against each other in different challenges. After each episode of the show was over, the audience at home got to vote for their favorite contestant by phone or text message. Contestants represented themselves, not their countries, therefore it was permissible to have more than one contestant from the same country or have the same nationality. Week by week the finalist with the lowest votes was eliminated. The winner of the contest won a contract to be one of the new personality faces on many of Univision's programs and award shows, and a chance to win more than $200,000 in cash and prizes and reign as Nuestra Belleza Latina for a year.

Alejandra Espinoza representing Mexico was the first winner.

Judges

Osmel Sousa 
Carlos Calderon
Alicia Machado

Elimination  chart

Contestants

Contestants

Season 1, Episode 1: Castings New York, Los Angeles and Miami
The best of the auditions held in New York, Los Angeles and Miami.
The Guest Judges were:''The following contestants were chosen:Season 1, Episode 2: Castings Houston, Chicago and P. Rico
The best of the auditions held in Houston, Chicago and Puerto Rico.Guest Judges:The following contestants were chosen:Season 1, Episode 3: Finding the 12 Finalists
All the selected girls go to Miami. The judges evaluate them on stage and pick their 12 favorites. They hit the runway and the audience gets to vote for the first time
The Final 12 are Chosen:

Season 1, Episode 4: Boot Camp
Original Air Date—10 April 2007
The 12 girls move to the "Mansion of the Beauty" where they start their physical training. At the gala, they perform a disco choreography in front of a live audience and walk the runway in bathing suit. At the end of the show, Marlene Alvarez is eliminated.

Season 1, Episode 5: Univision ID Challenge
Original Air Date—17 April 2007
The 11 remaining girls have to face the challenge of the week: Each one of them will have to shoot a 10 secs. ID for the Network. At the gala, they perform a sports themed choreography and walk the runway twice, one wearing cocktail dresses and the other in a sexy outfit. At the end of the show, Lorraine Lara is eliminated.

Season 1, Episode 6: Obstacle Course Challenge
Original Air Date—24 April 2007
The 10 remaining girls have to face the challenge of the week: A tough obstacle course. At the gala, they perform a nationalities themed choreography and walk the runway wearing bathing suits. At the end of the show, Joanna Parra is eliminated.

Season 1, Episode 7: Maybelline Photo Shoot
Original Air Date—1 May 2007
The nine remaining girls are divided in trios to face the challenge of the week: A themed photo-shoot for Maybelline New York. The winning team gets 10.000 dollars to share. At the gala, they perform a Garibaldi themed choreography. By the end of the show, Martha Maria Lopez is eliminated.

Season 1, Episode 8: Ford TV Ad Challenge
Original Air Date—8 May 2007
The eight remaining girls form two teams to face the challenge of the week: They have to create, produce, star and edit a TV commercial for a Ford product. The winning group gets 10.000 dollars to share. At the gala, they perform a 20's themed choreography and hit the runway wearing wedding dresses. By the end of the show, Angie Chavez is eliminated.

Season 1, Episode 9: JC Penney Fashion Show
Original Air Date—15 May 2007
The seven remaining girls face their last challenge: They have a JC Penney store closed for them. The task is to pick two complete outfits (casual and job interview) within the store is less than 15 minutes and perform a fashion show. The sole winner ends up with the 10.000 dollars prize. At the gala, the audience watch taped profiles of each one of the remaining contestants before the final voting. By the end of the show, Madelis Soto is eliminated.

Season 1, Episode 10: The Big Finale
Original Air Date—22 May 2007
This is a results show. The people have voted for their favorite. The six remaining contestants receive a final evaluation by the judges before they get to know their position. At the end of the show, Alejandra Espinoza is crowned as "Nuestra Belleza Latina 2007".Winner''':Alejandra Espinoza

Season 1, Episode 11: El destape
Original Air Date—25 May 2007
The best of this year's series. Deleted and extended scenes, backstage cameras, behind the scenes footage, interviews with the six finalists, the judges and the teachers.

Orden de llamados 

 The contestant won the challenge of the week
 The contestant was eliminated
 The contestant became runner-up
 The contestant won the competition

Contestants notes
 Raengel Solis competed Miss Dominican Republic Universe 2009 and finished as 4th Runner-Up.
 Yara Lasanta competed in Miss World Puerto Rico 2009 and finished as 1st Runner-Up. She previously competed in Miss Puerto Rico 2005 where she finished as 4th Runner-Up and then in Miss Puerto Rico 2007 where she finished as 2nd Runner-Up. She competed in Miss World 2010 win Miss World Beach Beauty and placed in Top 25.
 Alejandra Espinoza competed in Nuestra Belleza Mexico 2006 where she finished as 3rd Runner-Up.

References
 Nuestra Belleza Latina at Univision.com

External links
 Nuestra Belleza Latina - Official Page 

Univision original programming
Nuestra Belleza Latina